Simi (stylized in all caps) is the seventh mixtape by American rapper BlocBoy JB. It was released by his label Bloc Nation on May 4, 2018. The mixtape features guest appearances from Drake, Lil Pump, Moneybagg Yo, 21 Savage, and YG.  The mixtape was supported by two singles: "Look Alive" featuring Drake and "Rover 2.0" featuring 21 Savage, and one promotional single, "Nun of Dat" featuring Lil Pump.

Promotion

Singles
The mixtape's lead single, "Look Alive", was released for digital download on February 9, 2018, after the release of the Fredrick Ali-directed music video on February 8, 2018. The song was produced by Tay Keith. The song peaked at number five on the Billboard Hot 100.

The mixtape's second single, "Rover 2.0" featuring 21 Savage, was released on March 23, 2018, along with the Fredrick Ali-directed music video. The song was produced by Tay Keith.

Promotional singles
The mixtape's lead promotional single, "Nun of Dat" featuring Lil Pump, was released on May 2, 2018. The song was produced by Tay Keith.

Critical reception 
The mixtape received generally positive reviews. Paul A. Thompson of Pitchfork called the mixtape "honest, clear, and incredibly fun". He also said the tape was "beautifully executed", noting "Good Day" and "No Chorus, Pt. 11" as standout tracks on the project. Israel Daramola of Spin said that BlocBoy "captured his electric persona" on the mixtape. On a slightly less positive note, Marcus Blackwell of HipHopDX said that BlocBoy's charisma "carried" the mixtape, but that he had "limited mic skills".

In a mixed review, Andre Gee of Uproxx said that although BlocBoy "showed that he has considerable room for growth", but called the mixtape "unmemorable".

Commercial performance 
Simi debuted at number 28 on the Billboard 200 on the week ending May 19, 2018.

Track listing

Charts

Weekly charts

Year-end charts

References

2018 mixtape albums
BlocBoy JB albums
Albums produced by Tay Keith